The 1982 E3 Harelbeke was the 25th edition of the E3 Harelbeke cycle race and was held on 27 March 1982. The race started and finished in Harelbeke. The race was won by Jan Bogaert of the Europ Decor team.

General classification

References

1982 in Belgian sport
1982